Cham Wings Airlines (previously known as Sham Wing Airlines) is a private Syrian airline with its head office in Damascus, Syria. The company slogan is Fly Beyond The Limits.

History
Cham Wings Airlines was established on 9 July 2006 as the first private airline in Syria by independent Syrian businessman Issam Shammout. The main hub for the airline is Damascus International Airport. The company obtained officially an Aircraft Operators Certificate (AOC) issued by the Syrian Civil Aviation Authority (SCAA) on September 23, 2007. Although the AOC  comes second after the main national carrier of Syria, Syrian Air, the AOC authorised the company to operate non-scheduled charter flights only. 

The company leased one MD aircraft and commenced its first flight from Damascus to Baghdad International Airport on March 3, 2008.

In 2008, a newcomer entered the market under the name Syrian Pearl Airlines of ownership: Cham Holding 69% (Rami Makhlouf major shareholder), Syrianair 25%, Aqeeq Aviation/Aquila Holding 6%, (Aqeeq and Al Deshtei Kuwaiti). The partnership with Syrian Air gave Syrian Pearl the opportunity to operate scheduled flights, unlike Cham Wings which struggled in operating charter flights to destinations that Syrian Air hardly approves.  Even though Syrian Pearl never started its operations, Cham Wings could not turn profitable operating only charter flights. The company terminated its operations in 2012 following the unrest in Syria.

In 2014, Cham Wings Airlines obtained the approval to operate scheduled flights becoming the second national carrier in Syria. It then recommenced its operations to serve destinations like Beirut, Kuwait, Baghdad, and Qamishli.

In 2016, it was targeted by United States sanctions for providing support to the Syrian government.

In 2018 the airline advertised transporting Syrian refugees in Germany from Munich to Damascus and back, which can lead to the loss of their asylum status.

Due to ongoing 2021 Belarus–European Union border crisis, Cham Wings Airlines terminated their flights from Damascus to Minsk on short notice in November 2021, stating they cannot distinguish between regular travellers and illegal migrants. In December 2021, European Union sanctioned Cham Wings Airlines, accusing it of flying migrants to the Belarusian-Polish border and exacerbating the crisis. Switzerland joined the EU sanctions on December 20. EU sanctions imposed as a result of this accusation were lifted on 19 July 2022.

Ownership
Cham Wings Airlines is 100% privately owned by Syrian businessman Issam Shammout. The airline is part of his family business, Shammout Groups which operate in the automotive, steel and freight sectors.

Destinations
Cham Wings operates the following services (as of 29 November 2021):

Fleet

The Cham Wings Airlines fleet comprises the following aircraft (as of June 2022):

Sponsorship
As of 2021, the airline has been the official jersey sponsor of the Syria national basketball team.

References

External links
Cham Wings Airlines official website

Airlines of Syria
Low-cost carriers
Airlines established in 2007
Syrian companies established in 2007
Companies based in Damascus